Gondioc (died 473), also called Gunderic and Gundowech, was a King of the Burgundians, succeeding his putative father Gunther in 436.
 
In 406, the Burgundians under King Gundahar (Gundihar, Guntiar) at Mainz had crossed the Rhine and then settled with the permission of the Roman emperor Honorius on the Rhine. Gundahar's violent attempts to expand his empire to the west brought the Burgundians into conflict with the Romans 30 years later. In 435, a Burgundian army was defeated by Hunnic auxiliary troops under the Roman Aetius and finally destroyed. The Burgundian capital Worms was destroyed by the Huns.

Most of the surviving Burgundians joined the Romans as auxiliary troops under their new King Gondioc.
Aetius settled them in 443 as ' 'foederati' ' in western Switzerland and the Sapaudia (today's Savoy) as a buffer against the growing strength of the Alamanni. This settlement was the beginning of a Burgundian kingdom, with its capital at Geneva. 

In 451, Gondioc joined forces with Flavius Aetius against Attila, the king of the Huns, on the Catalaunian Plains. In 457, he quelled a rebellion in Lyons and took over the city in breach of the terms of his relationship with the Romans. In response, Emperor Majorian expelled Gundioc from the city. After Majorian's assassination in 461, Gondioc resumed an expansionist policy. He made Lyons his new capital, taking possession of the provinces of Gallia Lugdunensis (now Burgundy) and, in 463, Gallia Viennensis (Rhône valley).

After the death of Aetius in 454, Gondioc married the sister of Ricimer, the Gothic general at the time ruling the Western Roman Empire.

In 472, Gondioc was succeeded by his younger brother Chilperic I. After the death of Chilperic, Burgundy was divided among the sons of Gondioc: Gundobad, Chilperic II of Burgundy, Godomar and Godegisel.

See also
 List of Kings of Burgundy
 Burgundy (historical region)

References

473 deaths
Kings of the Burgundians
Burgundian warriors
5th-century monarchs in Europe
Year of birth unknown